Joseph Anthony Galante (July 2, 1938 – May 25, 2019) was an American prelate of the Roman Catholic Church who served as bishop of the  Diocese of Camden in New Jersey from 2004 to 2013.

He previously held several positions as a bishop in Texas from 1992 to 2004, after serving in the Roman Curia as undersecretary of the Congregation for Religious from 1986 to 1992.

Biography

Early life 
Joseph Galante was born on July 2, 1938, in Philadelphia.  He attended Saint Joseph's Preparatory School in Philadelphia and St. Charles Borromeo Seminary in Wynnewood, Pennsylvania, where he received his Bachelor of Arts degree in 1960.  

Galante was ordained to the priesthood for the Archdiocese of Philadelphia on May 16, 1964. At the Pontifical Lateran University in Rome, he earned his Doctor of Canon Law degree and at the Pontifical University of St. Thomas Aquinas, he received a Master of Spiritual Theology degree. Galante was named undersecretary of the Congregation for Religious in December 1986.

Bishop in Texas 
Galante held three positions in Texas as bishop:

 Auxiliary bishop of the Archdiocese of San Antonio.  Appointed by Pope John Paul II on October 13, 1992, Galante was consecrated as bishop by Archbishop Patrick Flores on December 11, 1992.
 Bishop of the Diocese of Beaumont. Appointed by John Paul II on April 5, 1994, he was installed on May 9, 1994.
 Coadjutor bishop of the Diocese of Dallas.  Appointed by John Paul II on November 23, 1999.  Galante never served as bishop of Dallas.

Bishop of Camden 
Galante was appointed bishop of Camden by John Paul II on March 23, 2004.  Galante was installed as bishop on April 30, 2004.  On April 2, 2008, Galante announced large-scale mergers and closings of half of the parishes in the Camden diocese. 

On July 18, 2008, the New York Post reported Galante's involvement in the so-called Vati-Con scandal involving Italian real estate developer Raffaello Follieri and investor Ronald Burkle. The Post reported that Galante sold Follieri a private beach house in Wildwood, New Jersey, for $400,000 in 2007. It also reported that one of Galante's priests misrepresented himself to potential investors. At the time, Follieri was negotiating with the Diocese of Camden and other US and Canadian dioceses to buy churches with Burkle's money and then sell the properties for later profit.

In September 2008, Follieri pleaded guilty to federal conspiracy, wire fraud, and money laundering charges, and received a -year prison sentence. The beach house was sold in 2010 for $310,000. Galante and Burkle were never charged with any crimes in relation to the scandal.

In January 2011, parishioners of the closed St Mary's Parish in Malaga, New Jersey, re-entered the church and began an around-the-clock vigil that attracted regional and national media attention. In a 2011 letter to Catholics in his diocese, Galante announced that he was suffering from chronic kidney disease caused by diabetes, but indicated that he could continue to serve as bishop of Camden.

Retirement and legacy 
In 2012, Galante asked the pope to be allowed to resign for health reasons; he served until his resignation was accepted by Pope Benedict XVI on January 8, 2013. Galante died on May 25, 2019, at Shore Medical Center in Somers Point, New Jersey, from a long illness.

References

External links
Roman Catholic Diocese of Camden Official Site

1938 births
2019 deaths
20th-century Roman Catholic bishops in the United States
American people of Italian descent
St. Joseph's Preparatory School alumni
St. Charles Borromeo Seminary alumni
People from Camden, New Jersey
People from North Wildwood, New Jersey
Clergy from Philadelphia
Pontifical Lateran University alumni
Catholics from New Jersey
21st-century Roman Catholic bishops in the United States